Bayview is an O-Train interchange station in Ottawa, Ontario, Canada, connecting the Confederation Line (Line 1) and Trillium Line (Line 2).

History
The station opened on October 15, 2001. It was built as an infill station between Tunney's Pasture and LeBreton (now Pimisi), with a pair of elevated bus platforms at the western end of Albert Street. Beneath it was the first O-Train station, the northern terminus of the Trillium Line, located on a stub-end track branching off from the railway line. Paved asphalt footpaths connected the two stops on opposite sides of the Transitway and the train platform.

On January 17, 2016, the transitway platforms closed for conversion to light rail, with all buses diverting via Albert Street. The station reopened on September 14, 2019, as an intermediate stop on the first phase of the Confederation Line, making Bayview an important rapid transit transfer point.

On September 16, 2017, the eastbound bus stop of Bayview Station was moved 300m west to facilitate the construction of the Trinity Development at 900 Albert Street.

During the reconstruction of the station, the original Line 2 O-Train station was closed and a new platform was constructed to the north, underneath the Line 1 station.

Location
The station, named for the nearby Bayview Road (now Bayview Station Road), is close to Tom Brown Arena. It is intended as a catalyst for large redevelopment including condos, hotels and the city's tallest office tower at 801 Albert. Plans also exist for converting a 1940s warehouse into a film studio and build an attached 15 storey "innovation hub".

Layout
The Confederation Line station is an elevated side platform station. A ticket barrier at platform level on the south (eastbound) platform provides access to Albert Street. Under the station, a concourse connects the two platforms with the single Trillium Line platform, and also contains a ticket barrier giving access to a footpath connecting the built-up area south of the station with the greenspace to its north. As part of the Stage 2 Trillium Line expansion, the existing Line 2 platform will be extended to accommodate longer trains. A second track and platform will also be built to the east of the existing tracks.

The station features two artworks: Cascades by Pierre Poussin, a set of two large sculptures located in the greenspace surrounding the station, and As the Crow Flies by Adrian Göllner, a linear sculpture running atop the barrier between the two tracks on the Confederation Line platform level.

Service

The following routes serve Bayview as of May 2020. Bus stops at Bayview are located outside of the O-Train fare-paid zone.

Gallery

References

External links

OC Transpo station page
OC Transpo's Bayview area map

Confederation Line stations
Trillium Line stations
Railway stations in Canada opened in 2001
2001 establishments in Ontario